The National Highway 50 or the N-50 is one of Pakistan National Highway running from city of D.I.Khan in Khyber Pakhtunkhwa to the town of Kuchlak near Quetta via Zhob in Baluchistan, Pakistan. Its total length is 531 km divided into 143 km in Khyber Pakhtunkhwa and the remaining 388 km in the Baluchistan, Pakistan. It is  maintained and operated by Pakistan's National Highway Authority.

On 30 Jan 2014, Prime Minister of Pakistan Nawaz Sharif inaugurated the Qila Saifullah to Zhob part of the highway.

See also 
 Motorways of Pakistan
 Transport in Pakistan

References

External links
 National Highway Authority

Roads in Pakistan